"A Message to Your Heart", written and composed by Paul Curtis, was the 's entry at the Eurovision Song Contest 1991, performed by singer and actress Samantha Janus. Paul Curtis had also penned the previous year's entry, "Give a Little Love Back to the World".

Janus went on to become a successful actress, starring in the sitcom Game On and the soap EastEnders. Despite her achievements, her entry into the Eurovision is frequently remarked upon. She has said regarding the experience that her failure in the contest devastated her at the time and thought it would spell the end of her career. She has also called her appearance "ridiculous", in that she was dressed in a pink mini-dress while singing about starving children and says the lyrics of the song are burned into her memory forever.

Background

Composition
Like the previous year, composer Paul Curtis submitted a topical entry for consideration; this time, the subjects were the less fortunate, suffering from poverty and starvation. Janus sung of the contrasts between the people who "are hungry just from being born", and the people who have too much, with "their only hunger being greed". The "message to [the] heart" refers to Janus imploring the better-off to, at the very least, say a prayer for the less fortunate, ending with the well-known John Bradford quotation, "There but for the grace of God, go I". The melody of the song is up-tempo.

Selection process
Janus won the right to perform at the contest, held in Rome in March 1991, by winning the UK national final, A Song for Europe, where she was the third singer to perform. As in the previous three years, the winner was picked via a nationwide telephone vote. Janus won over second-place finisher Brendan Faye by only 13,000 votes, in the slimmest margin since the telephone vote was introduced.

At Eurovision
On the night of the contest, Janus was dressed in a pink mini-dress, flanked by three women (Zoe Picot, Lucy Moorby, and Nikki Belsher) in white mini-dresses.

In Rome, the song was performed twentieth on the night, after 's Sergio Dalma with "Bailar pegados", and before ' Elena Patroklou with "SOS". At the end of judging that evening, "A Message to Your Heart" took the tenth-place slot with 47 points. It was the worst showing for the United Kingdom since 1987, and resulted in the 1992 Song for Europe being retooled as far as telephone voting was concerned.

Charts
After Eurovision, the song placed at No. 30 on the UK Singles Chart, and was in the chart for 3 weeks which was considered a big surprise by many.

References

External links
 Lyrics from Diggiloo Thrush

Eurovision songs of the United Kingdom
Eurovision songs of 1991
1991 in the United Kingdom
1991 singles
Songs written by Paul Curtis (musician)
1991 songs
Sony Music singles
Songs about poverty